The zebra seahorse (Hippocampus zebra) is a species of fish in the family Syngnathidae. It is endemic to northern Australia.

Habitat
This species of fish has been found inshore in and around coral reefs and it can also be found in areas with sand and mud bottoms, possibly associated with gorgonians. The maximum reported depth is 69 m. It is ovoviviparous, the male carries the eggs in a brood pouch which is situated under the tail.

References

External links
 Fishes of Australia : Hippocampus zebra

zebra seahorse
Marine fish of Northern Australia
Taxa named by Gilbert Percy Whitley
zebra seahorse
Taxonomy articles created by Polbot